Shirvani Arabic is a variety of Arabic that was once spoken in what is now central and northeastern Azerbaijan (historically known as Shirvan) and Dagestan (southern Russia).

History
Arabic had been spoken in the region since the Muslim conquest of the South Caucasus at the beginning of the eighth century. It was brought there by Arab settlers consisting mostly of military staff, merchants and craftsmen from Iraq and Syria, and was used as an official language. It experienced decline after the weakening of the Caliphate in the thirteenth century and was gradually replaced by Persian/Tat and Azerbaijani. Groups of Arabs (mostly from Yemen) continued to immigrate to southern Dagestan influencing the culture and literary traditions of the local population who had already become Muslim by way of conversion.

The latest documentation of the existence of Shirvani Arabic is attributed to the Azerbaijani historian Abbasgulu Bakikhanov who mentioned in his 1840 historical work Golestan-i Iram that "to this day a group of Shirvan Arabs speaks an altered version of Arabic." Arabic continued to be spoken in Dagestan until the 1920s mostly by upper-class feudals as a second or third language, as well as a language of literature, politics and written communication.

See also
Arabs in the Caucasus
Khuzestani Arabic
Central Asian Arabic

References

Arabic languages
Languages of Azerbaijan
Languages of the Caucasus
Extinct languages of Europe
Extinct languages of Asia